
Gmina Witnica is an urban-rural gmina (administrative district) in Gorzów County, Lubusz Voivodeship, in western Poland.

Villages
Apart from the town of Witnica, Gmina Witnica contains the villages and settlements of Białcz, Białczyk, Boguszyniec, Dąbroszyn, Kamień Mały, Kamień Wielki, Kłopotowo, Krześniczka, Mościce, Mościczki, Mosina, Nowe Dzieduszyce, Nowiny Wielkie, Oksza, Pyrzany, Sosny, Stare Dzieduszyce, Świerkocin and Tarnówek.

Neighbouring gminas
Gmina Witnica is bordered by the town of Kostrzyn nad Odrą and by the gminas of Bogdaniec, Krzeszyce, Lubiszyn and Słońsk.

Twin towns – sister cities

Gmina Witnica is twinned with:
 Druten, Netherlands
 Marushkinskoye, Russia
 Müncheberg, Germany

References

Witnica
Gorzów County